Roberto de Mattei (born 21 February 1948 in Rome, Italy) is an Italian Roman Catholic historian and author. His studies mainly concern European history between the 16th and 20th centuries, with a focus on the history of religious and political ideas. As traditionalist Catholic, he is known for his anti-evolutionist positions, also publicised in institutional circles, for his critique of relativism and the lines of thought established in the Catholic Church after the Second Vatican Council.

Biography 
De Mattei was formerly a student and assistant to the philosopher of politics Augusto Del Noce and to the historian Armando Saitta at the Faculty of Political Sciences of the Sapienza University of Rome

De Mattei has extensively studied European history of the 16th and 20th centuries, with particular focus on the history of religious and political ideas. He describes himself as "above all … a disciple of Professor Plinio Corrêa de Oliveira".

Among other academic positions, de Mattei was Professor of Modern History at the Faculty of Arts of the University of Cassino and is currently Professor of Modern History and History of Christianity and Coordinator of the Degree Course in Historical Sciences at the new European University in Rome, which was founded in 2004 under the sponsorship of the Legionaries of Christ.

Between 2003 and 2011 de Mattei was the Vice-President of the National Research Council of Italy. In that role, he has been highly criticized for his scientific ideas, in particular for having organized and funded a meeting supporting antievolutionism. This fact led part of the Italian scientific community to a request for his resignation. The controversy upsurged again after some statements by de Mattei, such as that the 2011 Tōhoku earthquake and tsunami in Japan was a divine punishment. Furthermore, he claimed the "contagion of homosexuality" had been responsible for the fall of the Roman Empire.

In February 2014, Mattei's monthly radio program, Radici Cristiane (Christian Roots), was cancelled by the director of Radio Maria because of Mattei's increasingly "critical position regarding the Pontificate of Pope Francis". In fact, Professor de Mattei was one of the first critics of Pope Francis to whom he dedicated the 11 February 2014 article "Motus in fine velocior" in Corrispondenza Romana. Among the various initiatives of criticism is also the Correctio Filialis De Haeresibus Propagatis, a 25-page letter written on 16 July 2017 and signed by 40 Catholic priests and lay scholars, sent to Pope Francis on 11 August 2017. In it, it states that the pope, through his Apostolic Exhortation Amoris laetitia and through other words, acts and omissions related to it, has endorsed 7 heretical positions, concerning marriage, moral life and the reception of the sacraments, and has caused the spread of these heretical views in the Catholic Church.

De Mattei has been described by progressive theologian Massimo Faggioli as "a renowned apologist for ultra-traditional Catholicism".

De Mattei is a member of the Board of Directors of the "Italian Historical Institute for the Modern and Contemporary Age", the John Paul II Academy for Human Life and the Family, and of the "Italian Geographic Society". He is President of the Lepanto Foundation (Rome - Washington) and he is editor-in-chief of the monthly review "Radici Cristiane", the quarterly historical review "Nova Historica", and the weekly "Corrispondenza Romana".

From February 2002 to May 2006, de Mattei held the post of Adviser for International Affairs to the Italian Government. He has cooperated with the Pontifical Council for Historical Sciences and has been awarded from the Holy See the Order of Knighthood of St. Gregory the Great, as acknowledgement to this service to the Church.

Among de Mattei's most recent publications is a history of Vatican Council II  (Il Concilio Vaticano II. Una storia mai scritta, Lindau, Turin 2010) wherein, without touching onto the theological debate on the hermeneutics of the Council, he suggests an historical view on the event which is antithetical to that proposed by the School of Bologna. Reviewers have noted the book's "archival discoveries from the ultra-traditionalist Lefebvrians" and its new information concerning the role of the traditionalist Coetus Internationalis Patrum at the Council. As the book's historical content raises questions about the nature of the intents of Second Vatican Council's main theologians and Popes, Mattei's book ended up drawing out heated criticism by both Catholic conservatives and progressives. Fr. Jared Wicks, S.J. and Massimo Faggioli, both progressives linked to Jesuit institutions, described it as "critically flawed" for its purported "denigration" of the Council's presiding Popes, and of the Council members who followed their reform agenda, as following a "conspiracy-driven Lefebvrian interpretation" and "essentially useless" for developing an understanding of Vatican II. However, Mattei's book draws heavily on primary sources that witnessed in first person both the Council and the historical development of the schools of the Nouvelle théologie, such as Fr. Ralph M. Wiltgen, S.V.D.'s book The Rhine Flows Into the Tiber: A History of Vatican II. Mattei's book has been translated into English as The Second Vatican Council - An Unwritten Story with Michael M. Miller as editor.

With the Lepanto Foundation, Professor de Mattei organised events called Acies Ordinata: the first in Rome on 19 February and 28 September 2019, the last in Munich on 18 January 2020. Various personalities from the traditional Catholic world of various nationalities have joined them. These were public demonstrations lasting one hour, where participants arranged in an orderly manner prayed the Rosary in silence, concluding with the singing of the Creed. These demonstrations took place on the eve of important ecclesiastical events: the summit of the presidents of the bishops' conferences (21 February 2019), the special synod of bishops for Amazonia (6 October 2019), synodal path of the German bishops (30 January 2020).

At the last event, among others, Archbishop Carlo Maria Viganò, Michael Matt, editor of the American newspaper Remnant (USA); Alexander Tschugguel, the young Austrian known for having thrown the Pachamama into the Tiber; John-Henry Westen - editor of the international blog LifeSiteNews; John Smeaton - president of the Society for the Protection of the Unborn Children (UK); Baroness Hedwig von Beverfoelde, German pro-life leader; German writer Gabriele Kuby, Count Peter zu Stolberg; Prof. Thomas Stark; Dr Thomas Ward, president of the British Catholic Doctors.

On the occasion of the start of the Covid-19 pandemic, de Mattei put forward the hypothesis of a SARS-CoV-2 escape from the Wuhan Laboratory. This hypothesis has been published in a book entitled Le misteriose origini del Coronavirus (The mysterious origins of Coronavirus) published in 2021 with Edizioni Fiducia. However, he distinguished himself from the openly anti-vax positions of a certain area of the traditional Catholic world by publishing a book on the moral permissibility of vaccines, thus adhering to the official position of the Catholic Church in favour of anti-Covid19 vaccination expressed by the Congregation for the Doctrine of the Faith on 21 December 2020.

When the Russian-Ukrainian conflict began on 24 February 2022, Professor de Mattei took a stance opposing the pro-Russian narrative, distancing himself from those authors from the mainstream Catholic world who sided with Vladimir Putin, including Archbishop Carlo Maria Viganò. De Mattei's perspective on the conflict is not limited to geopolitical aspects, but he rather believes that the key of interpretation for such dramatic events is the message of Fatima, as he recently stated. In this regard, Professor de Mattei considered valid the Consecration, made by Pope Francis on 25 March 2022, of Russia and Ukraine to the Immaculate Heart of Mary according to the dictates of Our Lady in the 1917 apparitions in Fatima.

Publications 

 1900-2000 - Due sogni si succedono: la costruzione la distruzione, Rome, Edizioni Fiducia, 1988, ISBN 9788886387002.
 Il crociato del secolo XX. Plinio Corrêa de Oliveira, Milan, Piemme, 1996, ISBN 9788838426438. Translated in 1997 in portuguese, I edition: Civilização, ISBN 972-26-1433-9, II edition: Artpress Editora, 2015, ISBN 978-85-7206-240-4; in french, L'Age d'Homme, ISBN 9782825110225; in spanish, Encuentro Ediciones, ISBN 9788474904574; in english, Gracewings, 1998, ISBN 0-85244-473-7; in german, TFP, 2004, ISBN 3-9501846-0-0; in polish, Piotra Skargi, 2004, ISBN 83-89591-06-5.
 Alta Ruet Babylon. L'Europa settaria del Cinquecento. Lineamenti storici e problemi ecclesiologici, Milano, Istituto di Propaganda Libraria, 1997, ISBN 88-7836-429-0. Second edition A sinistra di Lutero. Sette e movimenti religiosi nell'Europa del '500, Roma, Città Nuova, 1999, ISBN 88-311-0326-1. Third edition, Solfanelli, Chieti, 2017, ISBN 978-88-7497-667-6.
 Pio IX, Milano, Piemme, 2000, ISBN 88-384-4893-0. Translated in portuguese, Civilização, 2000, ISBN 972-26-1910-1 and in english, Gracewing, 2003, ISBN 0-85244-605-5.
 La souveraineté nécessaire. Réflexions sur la déconstruction de l’Etat et ses conséquences pour la société, Paris, Editions François-Xavier de Guibert, 2000. Translated in italian, il Minotauro, 2001, ISBN 978-88-8073-060-6 and in portuguese, Civilização, 2002, ISBN 972-26-2077-0. Second edition, I libri del Borghese, 2019, ISBN 978-88-7557-611-0.
 Quale papa dopo il papa, Milano, Piemme, 2002, ISBN 883846524X.
 Guerra santa guerra giusta. Islam e Cristianesimo in guerra, Milan, Piemme, 2002, ISBN 88-384-6980-6. Translated in portuguese, Civilização, 2002, ISBN 972-26-1686-2 and in english, Chronicles Press/The Rockford Institute, 2007, ISBN 978-0972061650.
 L'identità culturale come progetto di ricerca, Rome, Liberal Edizioni, 2004.
 La “Biblioteca dell’amicizia”. Repertorio critico della cultura cattolica nell'epoca della Rivoluzione 1770-1830, Naples, Bibliopolis, 2005, ISBN 88-7088-487-2.
 De Europa. Tra radici cristiane e sogni postmoderni, Florence, Le Lettere, 2006, ISBN 88-6087-002-X.
 La dittatura del relativismo, Chieti, Solfanelli, 2007, ISBN 88-89756-26-8. Translated in portuguese, Civilização, 2008, ISBN 978-972-26-2738-2; in polish, Warszawa, 2009, ISBN 978-83-61344-06-3 and in french, Muller Edition, 2011, ISBN 978-2-904255-92-2.
 Il CNR e le Scienze Umane. Una strategia di rilancio, Rome, National Research Council, 2008, ISBN 88-89756-26-8.
 La liturgia della chiesa nell'epoca della secolarizzazione, Rome, Solfanelli, 2009, ISBN 978-88-89-75659-1.
 Turchia in Europa. Beneficio o catastrofe?, Milan, SugarCo, 2009, ISBN 978-88-71-98573-2. Translated in english, Gracewing, 2009, ISBN 978-0-85244-732-1; in german, Resch Verlag, 2010, ISBN 978-3-935197-95-3 and in polish, Piotra Skargi, 2010, ISBN 978-83-88739-26-2.
 Il Concilio Vaticano II. Una storia mai scritta, Torino, Lindau, 2010, ISBN 88-7180-894-0. Translated in german, Sarto Verlag, 2011, ISBN 978-3-96406-011-2; in portuguese, Ambientes & Costumes, 2012, ISBN 978-85-61749-36-1; in polish, Centrum Kultury i Tradycji, 2012, ISBN 978-83-935242-1-1; in english, Loreto Publications, ISBN 9781622920020; in french, Muller Editions, 2013, ISBN 9791090947122; in spanish, Homo Legens, 2018, ISBN 9788417407124; in slovak, Nadácia Slovakia Christiana, 2019, ISBN 9788097259761. Prize Acqui-Storia 2013.
 Il mistero del male e i castighi di Dio, Verona, Fede & Cultura, 2011, ISBN 978-88-64-09110-5.
 Apologia della tradizione, Torino, Lindau, 2011, ISBN 978-88-7180-950-2. Translated in brazilian, Ambientes & Costumes, 2013, ISBN 978-85-61749-37-8; in french, Editions de Chiré, 2017, ISBN 9782851901880; in german, Grignon Verlag, 2018, ISBN 978-3-932085-67-3; in spanish, Dufourq y Viano, 2018, ISBN 978-987-42-6940-9 and in english, Angelus Press, 2019, ISBN 9781949124033.
 L'Euro contro l'Europa. Vent'anni dopo il Trattato di Maastricht (1992-2012), Rome, Solfanelli, 2012, ISBN 978-88-74-97752-9.
 Pio IX e la rivoluzione italiana, Siena, Cantagalli, 2012, ISBN 978-88-82-72763-5.
 La Chiesa fra le tempeste. Il primo millennio di storia della Chiesa nelle conversazioni a Radio Maria, Milan, Sugarco Edizioni, 2012, ISBN 978-88-7198-643-2. Translated in french, Le Drapeau blanc, 2017, ISBN 979-10-93228-09-9 and in english, Calx Mariae Publishing, 2022, ISBN 978-1-8384785-3-7.
 Vicario di Cristo. Il primato di Pietro tra normalità ed eccezione, Verona, Fede e Cultura, 2013, ISBN 978-88-64-09199-0.
 Il Ralliement di Leone XIII. Il fallimento di un progetto pastorale, Florence, Le Lettere, 2014, ISBN 978-88-6087-865-6. Translated in french, Les Editions du Cerf, 2016, ISBN 978-2-204-10555-2.
 Motus in fine velocior. On Eve of 2015 Synod, Rome, Edizioni Fiducia, 2015, ISBN 978-88-86387-12-5.
 Europa cristiana risvegliati, Rome, Lepanto, 2015.
 Plinio Corrêa de Oliveira. Apostolo di Fatima. Profeta del Regno di Maria, Rome, Fiducia, 2017, ISBN 978-88-86-38713-2.
 La Chiesa fra le tempeste. Vol. 2: Dal Medioevo alla Rivoluzione francese, Milan, Sugarco, 2018, ISBN 978-88-71-98736-1.
 Trilogia romana, Rome, Solfanelli, 2018, ISBN 978-88-33-05079-9.
 La critica alla rivoluzione nel pensiero di Augusto Del Noce, Florence, Le Lettere, 2019, ISBN 978-88-9366-1157.
 Love for the Papacy and Filial Resistance to the Pope in the History of the Church, Brooklyn, NY, Angelico Press, 2019, ISBN 978-1-62138-455-7.
 L’Isola misteriosa, Chieti, Solfanelli, 2020, ISBN 978-88-3305-220-5.
 Pio V. Storia di un papa santo, Turin, Lindau, 2021, ISBN 978-88-3353-567-8.
 Sulla liceità morale della vaccinazione, Rome, Edizioni Fiducia, 2021, ISBN 978-1-8384785-0-6. Translated with the same publisher and in the same year in english, ISBN 978-88-86387-27-9; in portuguese ISBN 978-88-86387-26-2; in german, ISBN 978-88-86387-30-9 and in french, ISBN 978-88-86387-29-3.
 Punishment or Mercy? The divine hand in the age of the coronavirus, London, Calx Mariae Publishing, 2021, ISBN 978-1-8384785-0-6.
 Le misteriose origini del coronavirus, Rome, Edizioni Fiducia, 2021, ISBN 978-88-86387-323. Translated in french, Editions David Reinharc, ISBN 9782493575180.
 I sentieri del male. Congiure, cospirazioni, complotti, Milan, Sugarco Edizioni, 2022, ISBN 978-88-7198-799-6.
 Breve Trattato sulla Divina Provvidenza, Rome, Edizioni Fiducia, 2022, ISBN 978-88-86387-36-1.
 I padrini dell'Italia rossa, Chieti, Solfanelli, 2022, ISBN 978-88-3305-408-7.
 Dio castiga il mondo? La fede di fronte al mistero del male, Verona, Fede & Cultura, 2022, ISBN 9791254780329.

Editor 

 Finis Vitae. Is Brain Death Still Life?, Soveria Mannelli, CNR-Rubbettino, 2006. Translated in italian, Rubbettino, 2007, ISBN 978-88-498-2026-3.
 Evoluzionismo. Il tramonto di una ipotesi, Siena, Cantagalli, 2009, ISBN 88-8272-500-6.
 Introduzione a San Pier Damiani, Liber Gomorrhianus, traduzione di Gianandrea de Antonellis, Rome, Edizioni Fiducia, 2015, ISBN 9788886387101. Translated in polish, Wydawnictwo, 2022, ISBN 978-03-7864-485-9.
 Il primo schema sulla famiglia e sul matrimonio del Concilio Vaticano II, Rome, Edizioni Fiducia, 2015, ISBN 9788886387118.
 Depositum Custodi, Rome, Edizioni Fiducia, 2018, ISBN 978-88-86-38715-6.
 Vecchio e nuovo modernismo. Radici della crisi nella Chiesa, Rome, Edizioni Fiducia, 2018, ISBN 978-88-86387-18-7.

References

External links 
 

1948 births
Living people
Intelligent design advocates
20th-century Italian historians
Italian Roman Catholics
Italian traditionalist Catholics
Traditionalist Catholic writers
Writers from Rome
National Research Council (Italy) people
21st-century Italian historians